Magna Steyr GmbH & Co KG is an automobile manufacturer based in Graz, Austria, where its primary manufacturing plant is also located. It is a subsidiary of Canadian-based Magna International and was previously part of the Steyr-Daimler-Puch conglomerate.

Magna Steyr engineers develop and assemble automobiles for other companies on a contractual basis; therefore, Magna Steyr is not an automobile marque.  In 2002, the company absorbed Daimler AG's Eurostar vehicle assembly facility. With an annual production capacity of approximately 200,000 vehicles as of 2018, it is the largest contract manufacturer for automobiles worldwide. The company has several manufacturing sites, with its main car production in Graz in Austria.

Magna Steyr developed Mercedes-Benz's "4Matic" all-wheel drive (AWD) system, and was the sole manufacturer of all E-Class 4Matic models between 1996 and 2006. The company also undertook substantial development on the BMW X3 and manufactured all original X3s (model code E83), and the Aston Martin Rapide. The company developed several cars on behalf of manufacturers such as the Audi TT, Fiat Bravo and Peugeot RCZ.

History
Magna Steyr GmbH & Co KG was founded in 2001 after Magna International Inc. acquired a majority shareholding in Steyr-Daimler-Puch AG three years earlier.

During the second quarter of 2015, the Magna Steyr battery pack business was sold to Samsung SDI for approximately $120 million.

Production

Current

Mercedes-Benz G-Class (2018–present)
BMW 5 Series (2017–2023)
Jaguar E-Pace (2017–present)
Jaguar I-Pace (2018–present)
BMW Z4 (2018–2024)
Toyota Supra (2019–present)
W Motors Fenyr SuperSport (2019–present)
Fisker Ocean (2022–present)

In March 2017 Magna Steyr started to produce the new BMW 5 Series sedan; production is shared with BMW Group's manufacturing plant in Dingolfing, Germany.

In early December 2016 Magna International announced it will build the new Jaguar I-Pace, the company’s first battery electric vehicle. Jaguar later said Magna Steyr will also assemble its E-Pace crossover, starting later in 2017. Magna Steyr confirmed the deal following Jaguar's announcement. Production for the I-Pace started in early 2018.

In January 2020, Sony presented a concept car, the Sony Vision-S,  which was developed and built in cooperation with Magna Steyr.
In October 2020 Magna International announced it would build a new electric vehicle, the Fisker Ocean, while taking a 6% ownership interest in Fisker Inc. Also the Ineos Grenadier 4x4 has been developed with expertise from Magna Steyr, with subsidiary Magna Powertrain working on the development of the chassis and suspension and the car being built at the former Smartville plant at Hambach in France.

Past models
 Voiturette (1904)
 Alpenwagen (1919)
 Puch 500/650/700c/126 (1957–1975)
 Haflinger (1959–1974)
 Pinzgauer (1971–2000)
 Volkswagen Transporter T3 4x4 (1984–1992)
 Volkswagen Golf Country (1990–1991)
 Audi V8L (1990–1994)
 Chrysler Voyager (April 1992 – December 2007)
 Jeep Grand Cherokee ZG, WG (1992–2004)
 Mercedes-Benz E-Class W210 (1996–2002) (all-wheel-drive)
 Mercedes-Benz M-Class W163 (1999–2002)
 Chrysler PT Cruiser PG (FY & FZ) (Jul 2001 – Jul 2002)
 Mercedes-Benz E-Class W211 (2003–2006) (all-wheel-drive)
 Mercedes-Benz E-Class S211 (2003—2009) (wagon)
 Saab 9-3 Convertible (2003–2009)
 BMW X3 (2003–2010)
 Chrysler 300C LE (2005–2010)
 Jeep Grand Cherokee WH (2005–2010)
 Jeep Commander XH (2006–2010)
 Mercedes-Benz SLS AMG (painted aluminum body) (2009–2014)
 Peugeot RCZ (2009–2015) 
 Aston Martin Rapide (2010–2012)
 Mini Paceman (2012–2016)
 Mini Countryman (2010–2016)

Car components
Mercedes-Benz SLK vario-roof assembly – over 500,000 produced since 1996
Opel Astra TwinTop convertible roof assembly – 2005–2010

Rear differential
FIAT Panda 4x4 mod. 141 (1986–2003) with name Steyr-Puch
FIAT Panda 4x4 and Panda 4x4 Cross mod. 319 (since 2012)
Renault Scenic RX4 (2000-2003)

Cancelled contracts
Porsche had announced in June 2008 that the Boxster and Cayman models would be manufactured by Magna Steyr from 2012, but this contract was cancelled in December 2009 and transferred to Karmann, a German car assembly company which was recently taken over by Porsche's parent company, Volkswagen.

MILA

Magna Steyr created the MILA (Magna Innovation Lightweight Auto) brand for its technology and research. Several concept cars have been shown at motor shows.

MILA Concept
The showcar was presented at the IAA in Frankfurt in 2005 as a one-seater sportscar. The first prototype of the CNG-powered vehicle was built in 2006. Mila 2, the two-seater version, followed.

MILA Future
Presented at the Geneva Motor Show 2007, the Mila Future is a sculpture with four roof options: coupé, landaulet, coupster (a crossover between a coupé and a roadster) and roadster.

MILA Alpin

The Alpin was a small, lightweight off-road vehicle for four passengers in a 3+1 seat arrangement announced at the 2008 Geneva Motor Show. It had an unusual mid-engine layout and was based on a low-cost production concept.

MILA EV
The Mila EV was a plug-in electric vehicle concept based on a modular lightweight platform, displayed at the 2009 Geneva Motor Show.

MILA Aerolight
At the Geneva Motor Show 2011, the fifth Mila concept car was presented: Mila Aerolight, a compact four-seater, powered by CNG.

MILA Coupic
The sixth concept car in the Mila family, the Mila Coupic, combines three vehicle concepts in one: a SUV coupé which can be transformed into a pick-up or a convertible. It was presented at the Geneva Motor Show 2012.

MILA Blue
The car achieves a weight saving of  compared to typical current A-segment vehicles powered by CNG.

MILA Plus

MILA Plus combines a lightweight construction with alternative-drive for performance and eco-friendliness. It was introduced to the public at the 2015 Geneva Motor Show.

See also
Karmann in Germany
Bertone and Pininfarina in Italy
Heuliez in France
Valmet Automotive in Finland

References

External links

Magna Steyr plant profile at Autoindex.org

Magna International
Motor vehicle assembly plants in Austria
Car manufacturers of Austria
Vehicle manufacturing companies established in 2001
Companies based in Graz
Contract vehicle manufacturers